The Carlos Palanca Memorial Awards for Literature winners in the year 1970 (rank, title of winning entry, name of author).


English division
Short story
First prize: “People of Consequence” by Ines Taccad Cammayo
Second prize: “Punch and Judas” by Emmanuel Lacaba
Third prize: “The Southern Seas” by Ninotchka Rosca

Poetry
First prize: “Selected Poems” by Hilario Francia Jr.
Second prize: “Selected Poems” by Alfredo O. Cuenca Jr.
Third prize: “Becoming and Other Poems” by Elsa M. Coscolluela

One-act play
First prize: “Run, David, Run” by Nestor S. Florentino II
Second prize: “Burning” by Elsa M. Coscolluela
Third prize: “Blood Spoor” by Elsa M. Coscolluela

Filipino division
Short story
First prize: “Servando Magdamag” by Ricardo Lee
Second prize: “Ang Bangkay sa Dalampasigan ng mga Uwak” by Dominador Mirasol
Third prize: “Dugo sa Kanyang Pagsilang” by Domingo Landicho

Poetry
First prize: “Peregrinasyon” by Virgilio S. Almario
Second prize: “Alay sa Lahi” by Ruben Vega
Third prize: “Maliwalu” by Epifanio San Juan Jr.

One-act play
First prize: “Vida” by Wilfredo Pa. Virtusio :P
Second prize: “Ang Uwak” by Levy Balgos Dela Cruz
Third prize: “Saan Pupunta ang Paruparo” by Rogelio Sikat

References
 

Palanca Awards
1970 literary awards